Dreamfarm (The Dream Farm Pty Ltd) is a design company headquartered in Brisbane, Australia. Founded in Australian Capital Canberra in 2003, Dreamfarm's range includes innovative kitchenwares and homewares, with potato masher Smood the best-selling product.

The company won its first Red Dot Design Award in March 2010 for "Clongs", click-lock sit up tongs, a design which includes resting points so that the working end of tongs does not come into contact with a bench surface.

History

Dreamfarm was founded in 2003 by the then 22-year-old Alexander Gransbury. The company's first product was the coffee grind knockbox, Grindenstein. Feeling frustrated with no easy way to dispose of the used coffee grinds from his home espresso machine, Gransbury built the first ever Grindenstein prototype out of a PVC pipe and a construction bolt. Within twelve months, Grindenstein – now made out of ABS plastic and Santoprene rubber – was being sold in selected retail stores around Australia, while still being built at Gransbury's family residence in Canberra. By the end of 2005, Grindenstein was being sold nationally and internationally.

Dreamfarm's production was moved offshore in 2006, so the company could continue to meet the increasingly high demand and provide products of an optimum quality. From there it was able to concentrate on designing and producing more products and extending the range.

Dreamfarm Europe BV was launched to sell directly to European retailers in June, 2006. Due to the fall of the Euro against the US dollar and increasing costs of freight and holding stock in The Netherlands, Dreamfarm Europe BV was closed in June, 2017.

In 2007, Dreamfarm secured distribution agencies in Canada, the US and New Zealand.

As the company continued to expand, the need to be based in a larger city became apparent. It relocated its headquarters to Brisbane, Queensland, in January 2008. To sell directly to the expanding USA market, Dreamfarm Inc was established as wholly owned distributor in May 2008 and Dreamfarm Australia Pty Ltd followed in 2013. Both subsidiaries run their own local warehouses to service retail stores and internet consumers. Their local sales and support staff manage teams of external sales representatives who call on over 1200 and 400 retail stores in the US and Australia respectively.

Dreamfarm is currently distributed in 23 countries worldwide, including France, Norway, Switzerland, Japan, Israel, Denmark, Ireland, the Philippines, South Africa and the United Kingdom. The UK is Dreamfarm's largest market (outside of Australia and the United States).

Products

The following is a list of Dreamfarm products, the year they were introduced and a brief description:

References
Tri-ply, dishwasher safe Bamboo flip up edge cutting board
 Kitchen wizard Alexander Gransbury creates a stir – The Courier-Mail Article – 25 January 2009
 Brits gobble up Australian products and ideas – The Courier-Mail Article – 25 January 2009
 Young guns make their mark on business - Dynamic Business Article – 28 October 2009
 My lightbulb moment – Virgin Blue Voyeur Magazine Article – September 2009 – p42
 Canberra companies kick goals in Ireland – ACT Chief Minister Jon Stanhope Media Release – 14 October 2005
 The Amazing Gadget That Will Solve All Your Nutella Problems - LADBible - 16 February 2018
 http://www.couriermail.com.au/business/dreamfarm-brisbane-business-inventing-cool-kitchen-utensils/news-story/55ce14c95759a534190bd12e19d17850 - The Courier Mail Article - 1 February 2017
IHA Presents gia Awards for Product Design - Home Furnishing News - 3 March 2019
Dreamfarm Kicks Off Crowdfunding Campaign For Pepper Mill  - HomeWorld Business - 24 October 2018
A cutting board that's a cut above - The Boston Globe - 7 January 2019
THE ORTWO ‘SINGLEHANDEDLY’ CHANGES HOW WE CRUSH PEPPER! - Yanko Design - 23 November 2018
Orlid Spice Jar Debuts From Dreamfarm - Gourmet Insider - 25 September 2020
Dreamfarm’s Spina, Orlid Kitchen Gadgets Win Good Design Awards - Home World Business - 18 September 2020

External links

Design companies of Australia
Manufacturing companies based in Brisbane
Design companies established in 2003
Australian companies established in 2003